Chapman Entertainment was a British television production company founded by Keith Chapman and Greg Lynn and based in London, England.

History

The 2001-2008 Era
The company was founded by Greg Lynn in London in 2001, together with Keith Chapman and Andrew Haydon a former managing director of John Reid Entertainment, an artist management company. The company was created for the purpose of exploiting both the intellectual property rights of Chapman's creations and also those of interested third parties.

The company is structured to allow greater rewards and input to property creators. This developed from Chapman's own frustrations at his lack of involvement with his Bob the Builder character. He created the character in the early nineties and struck a deal with HIT Entertainment which saw them develop the character. The project was handed over to Hot Animation, specifically Jackie Cockle and Curtis Jobling, who took the basic title and premise of the show and ran with it, developing the project in-house from a blank canvas. The resulting show was commissioned by the BBC. The company was credited to the Project Build It series.

In May 2005, Chapman Entertainment launched Fifi and the Flowertots, a stop-frame animation show on Five's Milkshake! and Nick Jr. The show has been sold into over 100 territories worldwide. Fifi and the Flowertots features the voices of Jane Horrocks and more.

In May 2007, Chapman Entertainment launched their second show, Roary the Racing Car on Five's Milkshake! and Nick Jr. The idea for the show was suggested by Brands Hatch employee David Jenkins and features the voices of comedian Peter Kay and more with racing driver Sir Stirling Moss as the narrator.

The 2008-2013 Era
In July 2011, Chapman Entertainment announced the departure of their MD Greg Lynn ahead of massive company redundancies, "soaring costs and challenging trading conditions" were listed as the reason's for the redundancies.

In August 2011, Chapman Entertainment announced the company being place for sale. It has placed poor toys sales as the main cause.

In November 2012, Chapman Entertainment announced the company being placed into administration, again blaming poor toys sales as the main cause.

In September 2013, DreamWorks Animation (which would be acquired by NBCUniversal in 2016) acquired Chapman Entertainment's TV library. The acquisition adds to DreamWorks growing library of family entertainment brands that also include properties gained when it acquired Classic Media in 2012. The Chapman programs will now be distributed through DreamWorks Animation's UK-based TV distribution operation.

As of 2022, Chapman's shows are currently available on Peacock, NBCUniversal's streaming service.

List of shows
Fifi and the Flowertots (2005–2010)
Roary the Racing Car (2007–2010)
Little Charley Bear (2011–2015) (Co-produced by HIT Entertainment)
Raa Raa the Noisy Lion (2011–2018)

References

External links
 

Television production companies of the United Kingdom
DreamWorks Animation
Entertainment companies established in 2001
Entertainment companies disestablished in 2013
2001 establishments in the United Kingdom
2013 disestablishments in the United Kingdom